Chittoor may refer to:

Chittoor, Andhra Pradesh, a city in and district headquarters of Chittoor district, Andhra Pradesh, India
Chittoor district, a district in Rayalaseema region, Andhra Pradesh, India
Chittoor mandal, Andhra Pradesh, a mandal in Chittoor district, Andhra Pradesh, India
Chittoor revenue division, Andhra Pradesh, a revenue division in Chittoor district, Andhra Pradesh, India
Chittorgarh, a city and district headquarters of Chittorgarh district, Rajasthan, India
Chittorgarh district, a district in Rajasthan, India
Chittur, a town in Palakkad district of Kerala, India

Transport
Chittoor Road, a major arterial road in the city of Kochi, India